Coulouba Sogoré (born 3 June 1997) is a Malian footballer who plays as a defender for the Mali women's national team.

Club career
Sogoré has played for AS Real in Mali and for AJ Auxerre in France.

International career
Sogoré competed for Mali at the 2018 Africa Women Cup of Nations, playing in five matches.

References

External links

1997 births
Living people
People from Koulikoro Region
Malian women's footballers
Women's association football defenders
AJ Auxerre players
Mali women's international footballers
Malian expatriate footballers
Malian expatriate sportspeople in France
Expatriate women's footballers in France
21st-century Malian people